Mahendra P. Lama is an Indian professor and a development economist who was the pro-vice chancellor of IGNOU and the founding vice chancellor of Sikkim University in India. At the age of 45, he became the youngest vice chancellor of a National Central University in India. He is presently a senior Professor in the School of International Studies , Jawaharlal Nehru University, New Delhi; Chief Economic Adviser in the Government of Sikkim (Cabinet Minister Rank) and Member of the Eminent Persons Group on Nepal-India Relations appointed by the Prime Ministers of India and Nepal.

Education
Prof. Lama completed his graduation from St Joseph's College, Darjeeling and did his Masters and Ph.D. from Jawaharlal Nehru University, New Delhi. Lama has worked and published on issues related to cooperation and integration in South Asia and on issues of trade, investment, migration, development, borderlands in the Himalayan Regions and China.

Career
Prof. Lama had been Chairperson, Centre for South, Central, Southeast Asia and South West Pacific Studies at the School of International Studies, Jawaharlal Nehru University, New Delhi, Asia Leadership Fellow in Japan, Nehru Fulbright Fellow in USA, High End Expert at Sichuan University in China, a Ford Foundation Fellow at Notre Dame University, USA, and a Visiting Professor in Hitotsubashi University and Tsukuba University in Japan. He also served as the chief economic adviser in the Government of Sikkim for seven years (2000-2007). Lama was a Member of the National Security Advisory Board of the Government of India and India –China Fellow at the New School University, USA. In 1997 and 2011, he was nominated by the Indian government to serve in the Independent Expert Group (1997-1999) and South Asia Forum (2011-2016) set up by the South Asian Association for Regional Cooperation (SAARC). He was also a member of the National Committee for the Revamping of the North Eastern Council in 2004, and the national steering committee for the North East Vision document - 2020. Lama is an author. He has written and edited several books and scholarly articles and some of this works have been translated into Japanese, French and German Language.

Recent engagements
He is the principal author of the 'North East Region Vision 2035' of NITI Aayog, New Delhi (2021). 

In the last few years, the President of India has nominated Lama to eight institutions of India as her/his representative. Lama has also been nominated by the University Grants Commission in various Review Committees of the Central and State Universities, as the Chairman of the Area Studies Programme and member Commonwealth Fellowship Selection Committee. He has also been a member of the prestigious Interviews Board for the all India Civil Services Examinations conducted by the Union Public Service Commission and also at the state level in Public Service Commission of Sikkim.

The architect of the reopening of the historic Nathu la trade route between Sikkim in India and Tibet Autonomous Region in China after 44 years in 2006, he is also a life member of a number of pioneering Nepali literary and cultural organizations in India. He has also served as the member of the Prime Minister's Task Force on Hill and Mountain Development under the aegis of National Planning Commission. He has been associated as a professional with the World Bank, Asian Development Bank, United Nations Development Programme, USAID, Australian Aid Agency, Asia Foundation, IDRC of Canada and ICIMOD in Kathmandu and many other international organisations. He was also assigned the task of reviewing the functioning of SAARC by Asian Development Bank and SACEPS since its inception. He also wrote a column known as “Serophero” in Nepal's fortnightly Himal Khabar Patrika. He wrote a column “Ghamko khojima” in Himalaya Darpan, a daily newspaper published from Siliguri. He also contributed columns in Nepal's English daily Kathmandu Post.  and continues to write a fortnightly column 'Chuchurobata' in Nepal's daily Kantipur.

He has been associated with a number of national and international organisations including New Delhi's India International Centre,
University Grants Commission, Sahitya Academy, National Book Trust and Indian Council of World Affairs. He has delivered over 250 Special / Public Lectures in the institutions both in India and abroad including in premier</ref></ref> global institutions like Yale University, Oxford University, Stanford University, Notre Dame University, New School University and National Defense College (NDC), to IFS/IAS/IPS probationers and a large number of Universities and other institutions. He has participated in over 400 Seminars/Conferences both in India and in 34 countries.
abroad.

Publications

Select books and monographs 

Most recent book  :  "Oh Darjeeling" (in Nepali) published by Kitab Publishers, Kathmandu, Nepal, 2021

"Strategic Roadmap for Bringing Investors from South East Asia (CLMV & Thailand) to North East India: A Seed Project Approach", (Principal Author), North Eastern Development Finance Corporation Ltd (NEDFi), Guwahati, 2021

"Fledgling sub-regionalism in Eastern South Asia: Reasons for China’s shift towards Bilateralism in BCIM", Occasional Paper Series, Institute of Chinese Studies, New Delhi, 2021

Energising Connectivity between Northeast India and its Neighbours. Economic Research Institute for ASEAN and East Asia, Jakarta 2019, .
"India and China : Rethinking Borders and Security", (co-authored with LHM Ling et al). University of Michigan Press, USA, 2016
Globalisation and Cultural Practices in Mountain Areas: Dynamics, Dimensions, and Implications. Sikkim University Press, 2012, .
 Human Security in India: Discourse, Practices, and Policy Implications. Bangladesh Institute of International and Strategic Studies. 2010, .
 Gorkhaland Movement: Quest for an Identity. Department of Information and Cultural Affairs, Darjeeling Gorkha Hill Council, 1996.
 Sikkim Human Development Report 2001. Social Science Press, 2001, .
 Managing Refugees in South Asia: Protection, Aid, State Behaviour, and Regional Approach. Refugee and Migratory Movements Research Unit, University of Dhaka, 2000.
 Integrated Programme of Action in SAARC: Genesis, Evaluation, Constraints, and Rationale for Revamping. Research and Information System for the Non-Aligned and Other Developing Countries, 1999, .
 Thakur Chandan Singh: Makers of Indian Literature, Sahitya Akademi. 1997, .
 Regional Economic Cooperation in South Asia: A Commodity Approach. Society for Peace, Security & Development Studies, 1997.
Sikkim: Society, Polity, Economy, Environment. Indus Publishing Company, 1994, .
BBIN Initiatives: Options for Cross-Border Power Exchange , ORF Issue Brief No 137, Observer Research Foundation and Asia Foundation, New Delhi , 2016
"India-Nepal Peace and Friendship Treaty 1950: Implications for Indian Gorkhas and Policy Suggestions", Bharatiya Gorkha Parisnagh and Darjeeling Dooars United Development Foundation, Darjeeling , 2016
"Unravelling Inclusiveness in North East India :  Lessons from the Experimentations of Indian Gorkhas"; Samata Annual lecture IV, SAMATA Foundation, Kathmandu, 2014
"SAARC 2015 : Expanding Horizons and Forging Cooperation in a Resurgent Asia : The Delhi Statement" , (with Ambassador KK Bhargava) Fredrich Ebert Stiftung, New Delhi, 2007
"Pipelines and Powergrids for Peace",  (with Rasul Bakhsh Rais, Quaid-I- Azam University, Islamabad), ICPI, Mumbai and Kings College, London ( 2001)
"New Perspectives on India-Nepal Relations" ( with Kalim Bahadur),  (Har-Anand Publications, New Delhi, 1995)
"Economic Cooperation in the SAARC Region  :  Potential, Constraints and Policies", (with VR Panchamukhi et al.),  (Interest Publications, Delhi, 1990)
"Tea Plantation Workers in the Eastern Himalayas"‚ (with RL Sarkar), (Atma Ram and Sons, Delhi, 1986)
"The Eastern Himalayas : Environment and Economy"‚(with RL Sarkar), (Atma Ram and Sons, Delhi, 1986)
"The Economics of Indo-Nepalese Cooperation: A Study on Trade, Aid and Private Foreign Investment"‚ (Atma Ram and Sons, Delhi, 1985)

References

1961 births
Living people
People from Darjeeling
Educators from West Bengal
Academic staff of Sikkim University
Academic staff of Jawaharlal Nehru University
Candidates in the 2014 Indian general election
Ford Foundation fellowships
Nepali-language writers from India